Markus Steele (born July 24, 1979) is a former American football linebacker in the National Football League for the Dallas Cowboys. He played college football at the University of Southern California.

Early years
Steele attended the now defunct St. Peter Chanel High School, where he lettered in football and basketball. He played only two years of football and missed most of his junior season with a broken ankle. As a senior, he played running back and middle linebacker, scoring 17 touchdowns in just 6 games, because he was suspended for poor grades.

He enrolled Long Beach City College, where he collected 96 tackles, 20 tackles for loss, 8 sacks and 2 interceptions in his first year. As a sophomore he registered 93 tackles, 17 tackles for loss, 8 sacks, 3 forced fumbles, 2 blocked kicks, 4 carries for 39 yards (9.8-yard avg ) and 2 touchdowns, while helping the team achieve a No. 6 national ranking with a 10–1 record.

In 1999, he transferred to the University of Southern California and was given the number 55, which is a school tradition reserved for the best linebackers.

As a junior he was named the starter at weak-side linebacker. He played with a shoulder injury that required surgery at the end of the season, finishing with 91 tackles (second on the team), 62 solo tackles, 12 tackles for loss (led the team), 3 sacks, 6 passes defensed, one interception, 3 forced fumbles and 2 fumble recoveries. The next year he had 61 tackles (third on the team), 17 tackles for loss (led the team) and 3 sacks.

Professional career

Dallas Cowboys
Steele was selected by the Dallas Cowboys in the fourth round (122nd overall) of the 2001 NFL Draft, because he was seen as a great athlete that lacked football instincts. After strong-side linebacker Darren Hambrick was waived by the team, following the fifth game of the season, and with little depth at the linebacker position, he was named the starter as a rookie. He played in 15 games (10 starts), making 51 tackles, 2 tackles for loss, one quarterback pressure, one forced fumble and 3 special teams tackles.

In 2002, he was relegated to a backup position after the Cowboys signed free agent Kevin Hardy. He still was able to start 3 games at middle linebacker because of injuries. He collected 18 tackles, one tackle for loss, 14 special teams tackles (fifth on the team) and blocked a punt against the San Francisco 49ers.

The next season, although Hardy left via free agency, he could not unseat free agent Al Singleton from the starter role. He posted 2 defensive tackles and 16 special teams tackles (third on the team).

Steele was waived on August 31, 2004, after playing in 42 games (12 starts), while totaling 71 tackles (49 solo) and 33 special teams tackles.

Denver Broncos
On January 1, 2005, Steele signed with the Denver Broncos as a free agent. He was released on August 30.

Northeast Ohio Predators 
In 2013, he started playing, middle linebacker and coaching defense, for the Northeast Ohio Predators, which is a semi-professional team in the Heartland Football League. He married Kimberlee Steele

References

External links
 Steele Is Quick to Show His Mettle for Trojans

1979 births
Living people
Players of American football from Cleveland
American football linebackers
Long Beach City Vikings football players
USC Trojans football players
Dallas Cowboys players